Alexander Peya and Bruno Soares were the defending champions, but they chose to compete (with different partners) in Vienna instead.

Marcel Granollers and Jack Sock won the title, defeating Robert Lindstedt and Michael Venus in the final, 6–3, 6–4.

Seeds

Draw

Draw

Qualifying

Seeds

Qualifiers
  Federico Delbonis /  Guido Pella

Qualifying draw

References
 Main Draw
 Qualifying Draw

]
Doubles